Yannik is a German male given name. Notable people with the name include:

 Yannik Cudjoe-Virgil (born 1992), American American football player
 Yannik Oenning (born 1993), German footballer
 Yannik Oettl (born 1996), German footballer
 Yannik Omlor (born 1996), German squash player

See also 
 Yannick

German masculine given names